Autism Rocks was a United Kingdom-based charitable organisation founded by Sanjay Shah to raise awareness about autism through charitable music events. All funds raised by Autism Rocks went to the Autism Research Trust, which in turn supported research by the Autism Research Centre at Cambridge University.

Overview 
Autism Rocks gained international popularity after organising an event with late music artist Prince. The Guardian reported that Prince 'love-bombed' the crowd. Artists such as Zayn Malik, Lenny Kravitz, Snoop Dogg and Ricky Martin have also participated.

It created the Autism Rocks Support Centre, one of the first not-for-profit autism centres in the United Arab Emirates.

Closure 
It opened in 2017, but the Centre shut down in February 2020 amidst the tax fraud probe against Sanjay Shah.

References

External links 
 Official website

Autism-related organisations in the United Kingdom
Charitable trusts
Charities for disabled people based in the United Kingdom